Glitterati (derived from 'glitter' and 'literati') may refer to:

 The Glitterati, a British band
 Glitterati (album), an album by that band
 Glitterati (film), a 2004 film directed by Roger Avary
 Fashionable supermodels, celebrities and socialites
 An LGBT rights group involved in glitter bombing politicians